Alan J. Wilson (born 1947), is a British composer of church music.

Professional career
He was born in 1947, in Nottingham, UK, and won a scholarship to the Royal College of Music at the age of 17. He attended composition classes with Nadia Boulanger and studied on a scholarship at the Conservatorium van Amsterdam early keyboard music with Gustav Leonhardt. From 1974 to 1986 he was Director of Music at the Church of Christ the King, Bloomsbury, for whose choir he originally wrote many of his choral works. In 1976, he became Director of Music at Queen Mary College London; and in 1986, he became organist at the church of St. Mary-le-Bow.

At St. Mary-le-Bow, he has been engaged in researching music by William Babell and John Stanley, while his work at Queen Mary College has engaged him in new compositions, including:
 a commissioned rock opera ('The Palace of Delights') in 1984
 an inter-faith cantata ('The Harmony of the Spheres') in 2001
He has also conducted research to restore and edit originally produced songs from the college archives,
including the 'Westfield Songbook' (1880 to c.1930).
He has set many of the writings of Constance Louisa Maynard (the first Principal of Westfield College)
to music, including 'The Downs' (a cantata) and several poems and hymns.
  
He is one of few composers who has taken seriously the use of synthesizers in the classical medium.
Examples include the 'Norwich Mass' and 'Norwich Magnificat and Nunc Dimittis', written for the Norwich Festival of Contemporary Church Music. They were published by Weinberger along with a commissioned work for Christ Church Cathedral, Indianapolis. Inspired by Bells was recorded by Doremi in 1995.

Wilson has also been involved in broadcasting, mainly the BBC Daily Service, where he has directed and also composed and arranged many compositions.

Wilson's Mass of Light was performed in 2010 at St George's Cathedral, Cape Town.

He has received frequent invitations from the heads of dioceses in Germany to run workshops, (for example, at the Wolfsburg Catholic Conference Centre in the diocese of Essen), mainly using his own, often new works.
His Magnificat, from 'Christus Rex', has become a major performed work in Germany. This, and many of the works listed in the references (below), appear in 'Freiburger Chorbuch'.

Performing artist
As well as being a recital organist, he has worked in mainstream ensembles as a harpsichordist.
He was in the Consort of Musicke for many years, performing with Emma Kirkby and Anthony Rooley.

Awards
He received an honorary Associate award from the Royal School of Church Music in Durham Cathedral in May 2010, for his work for the RSCM, and his work as a church composer.

Other works
 Christ is now risen again
 Mass of Light
 Mass of All Saints
 Mass of Regeneration
 Mass of the Holy Trinity
 Magnificat and Nunc Dimittis
 Seasonal Carols Old and New (4 volumes)
See, also, the list of 'References to other works', below.

References
The following references are all to the published sheet music.

References to other works
The following lists some of Wilson's other works, with bibliographic references (again, to the published sheet music)
 Alan Wilson. Our Faith is a Light. SATB and Organ. 8pp. Josef Weinberger Ltd., London, UK (M570053698, HL.48016538)
 Alan Wilson (1999). Haec dies / Christus in Ewigkeit. High Voice, SATB Choir, Organ (Pianoforte, Keyboard). 8pp. Carus-Verlag (CA.739900)
 Alan Wilson (2004). Missa Adventis et Quadragesima (Missa Adventis et Quadragesima). Speaker, Congregation, SATB Choir, Organ. 16pp. Carus-Verlag (CA.2706200)
 Alan Wilson. Fantasia on Ubi Caritas (Organ Solo). Organ. Weinberger. 19pp. Josef Weinberger Ltd., London, UK (M570053810, HL.48016569)
 Alan Wilson (1992). Missa Transfigurationis. Solo Soprano, Organ (Children's Choir or Women's Choir or Schola). 12pp. Carus-Verlag (CA.2706100)
 Alan Wilson. Cantate Domino. Choir/Organ. 11pp. Josef Weinberger Ltd., London, UK.
 Alan Wilson. Light of Christ. SATB Choir. 2pp. Josef Weinberger Ltd., London, UK.
 Alan Wilson. Let There be Light. SATB Choir. 2pp. Josef Weinberger Ltd., London, UK.
 Alan Wilson. The Holly Carol. Choir/Piano. 6pp. Josef Weinberger Ltd., London, UK.
 Alan Wilson. The Distant Light. Choir/Piano. 6pp. Josef Weinberger Ltd., London, UK.
 Alan Wilson. From East to West. Choir/Piano or Organ. 5pp. Josef Weinberger Ltd., London, UK.
 Alan Wilson. We Were Born for a Journey. Choir/Piano. 3pp. Josef Weinberger Ltd., London, UK.
 Alan Wilson. Come Holy Ghost. Choir/Piano. 3pp. Josef Weinberger Ltd., London
 Alan Wilson. The Wynstan Voluntary. Organ Solo. 2pp. Josef Weinberger Ltd., London
 Alan Wilson. Cathedral Responses. SATB. 12pp. Joseph Weinberger (HL.48016537)
 Alan Wilson. Our Faith is a Light. Soprano Solo, SATB and Organ. 8pp. Joseph Weinberger (HL.48016538)

External links
 Alan J. Wilson bach-cantatas.com
 Staff summary page at Queen Mary College
 

1947 births
Classical composers of church music
English classical composers
Living people
20th-century classical composers
21st-century classical composers
People from Nottingham
Alumni of the Royal College of Music
English male classical composers
20th-century English composers
20th-century British male musicians
21st-century British male musicians